Pierre Langlois is a Canadian economist and political strategist.

Born in Montreal, Quebec, Canada, he graduated from the Université de Montréal with a B.A. (1998) and a M.A (1999) in economics.  His master's thesis was on growth theory with empirical evidences from U.S. metropolitan areas.

Economic advisor 

While working at the Ottawa-based Conference Board of Canada as an associate economist, Langlois was recruited by newly appointed Parti Québécois finance minister, Pauline Marois.  Langlois, at 26 years, became a senior top advisor.  He was highly involved in the budget preparation and other legislative operations and was a key line writer for the daily question period.

In 2003, Langlois was appointed by the office of the Premier of Quebec as an economic advisor for the upcoming provincial election.  Pierre Langlois is seen in the movie À Hauteur d'homme, which is a documentary of the 2003 PQ campaign.

Between 2003 and 2005, Langlois served as a political content advisor to leadership candidate Pauline Marois.

Parti Québécois and Bloc Québécois involvement 

In 2005, Langlois was approached to replace Marcel Lussier, who was fighting cancer, as the Bloc Québécois candidate in the Brossard—La Prairie riding.  He refused, alleging his already packed political agenda.

During the 2006 federal election, Bloc Québécois officials asked Langlois to manage Lussier’s campaign against incumbent Liberal minister Jacques Saada.  Langlois delivered a surprise victory for the Bloc in this traditionally Liberal riding.

In June 2006, Langlois declined to run for the PQ in the provincial riding of La Prairie, alleging family reasons.

On April 13, 2012, Pierre Langlois along with Pauline Marois, declared his candidacy for the open seat of La Prairie in the upcoming provincial election for the Parti Québécois.  Pauline Marois, leader of the Parti Québécois, presented Langlois as a key member of her economic team.

On September 4, 2012, Pierre Langlois lost by 81 votes against Stephane Le Bouyonnec of the Coalition Avenir Quebec (CAQ) in a close contest.  A recount officialized Le Bouyonnec's victory by 75 votes on September 14, 2012. 

On April 7, 2014, Pierre Langlois ran for the PQ provincial party a second time and came in third in voting results. Having a total of 8,591 valid votes (26.25% of valid ballots). Losing to Stephane Le Bouyonnec of the Coalition Avenir Quebec (CAQ) and Richard Merlini of the Quebec Liberal Party (PLQ) 

Pierre Langlois is currently working as an economist in the private sector.

References

La Presse: Deux économistes sur la Rive-Sud pour le PQ April 13, 2012
La Presse: Des mouvements de troupes sur la Rive-Sud February 22, 2012
Argent: Immobilier et les villes minières August 15, 2011
Argent: Le boom minier entraîne une flambée immobilière August 15, 2011
Argent: Le condo la locomotive de l'immobilier à Montréal August 10, 2011
Le Quotidien: Les pénalités hypothécaires heurtent les consommateurs January 26, 2011
24H: Pénalités hypothécaires : Flaherty prié d'intervenir February 8, 2011
First-time buyers will feel pinch January 21, 2011
The Gazette: Mortgage rules will scale down purchases Quebec experts January 18, 2011
ARGENT: Ottawa va sattaquer aux ventes de condos January 14, 2011
La Presse: Ottawa chambarde la loi pour contrer le blanchiment June 11, 2008
Le Reflet: Une majorité de députés en faveur de la 30 au nord November 3, 2007
Le Reflet: Pierre Langlois ne sera pas candidat June 17, 2006
Le Devoir: Le Québec emprunte aux Mexicains February 3, 2006
Le Reflet: Le Bloc intensifie sa présence dans Brossard - La Prairie December 24, 2005
La Presse: Un vote comme dans une téléréalité June 19, 2005
Le Devoir: Marois cachait une autre surprise à Landry  Septembre 2, 2004

Political consultants from Quebec
Canadian economists
People from Montreal
Université de Montréal alumni
Living people
Year of birth missing (living people)